Chromium(II) chloride describes inorganic compounds with the formula CrCl2(H2O)n. The anhydrous solid is white when pure, however commercial samples are often grey or green; it is hygroscopic and readily dissolves in water to give bright blue air-sensitive solutions of the tetrahydrate Cr(H2O)4Cl2. Chromium(II) chloride has no commercial uses but is used on a laboratory-scale for the synthesis of other chromium complexes.

Synthesis
CrCl2 is produced by reducing chromium(III) chloride either with hydrogen at 500 °C:
2CrCl3 + H2 → 2CrCl2 + 2HCl
or by electrolysis.

On the laboratory scale,  LiAlH4, zinc, and related reductants produce chromous chloride from chromium(III) precursors:
4 CrCl3 + LiAlH4 → 4 CrCl2 + LiCl + AlCl3 + 2 H2
2 CrCl3 + Zn → 2 CrCl2 + ZnCl2

CrCl2 can also be prepared by treating a solution of chromium(II) acetate with hydrogen chloride: 
Cr2(OAc)4  +  4 HCl → 2 CrCl2 + 4 AcOH

Treatment of chromium powder with concentrated hydrochloric acid gives a blue hydrated chromium(II) chloride, which can be converted to a related acetonitrile complex.
Cr +  nH2O  +  2HCl  →   CrCl2(H2O)n  +  H2

Structure and properties
Anhydrous CrCl2 is white however commercial samples are often grey or green. It crystallizes in the Pnnm space group, which is an orthorhombically distorted variant of the rutile structure; making it isostructural to calcium chloride. The Cr centres are octahedral, being distorted by the Jahn-Teller Effect.

The hydrated derivative, CrCl2(H2O)4, forms monoclinic crystals with the P21/c space group. The molecular geometry is approximately octahedral consisting of four short Cr—O bonds (2.078 Å) arranged in a square planar configuration and two longer Cr—Cl bonds (2.758 Å) in a trans configuration.

Reactions
The reduction potential for Cr3+ + e− ⇄ Cr2+ is −0.41. Since the reduction potential of H+ to H2 in acidic conditions is +0.00, the chromous ion has sufficient potential to reduce acids to hydrogen, although this reaction does not occur without a catalyst.

Organic chemistry
Chromium(II) chloride is used as precursor to other inorganic and organometallic chromium complexes. Alkyl halides and nitroaromatics are reduced by CrCl2. The moderate electronegativity of chromium and the range of substrates that CrCl2 can accommodate make organochromium reagents very synthetically versatile. It is a reagent in the Nozaki-Hiyama-Kishi reaction, a useful method for preparing medium-size rings. It is also used in the Takai olefination to form vinyl iodides from aldehydes in the presence of iodoform.

References

Chromium(II) compounds
Chlorides
Metal halides
Reducing agents